The Greenwood Academies Trust  is a large multi-academy trust in England, centred around the Nottingham Academy, which was formerly the Greenwood Dale School. There are 34 academies within the trust, educating over 17,000 pupils. The trust's mission is "to enable every child within our academies to be the best they can be".

Organisation
The academies within the trust are clustered into four geographical regions:
East Coast
Northamptonshire / Central Bedfordshire
Nottingham / Leicester
Peterborough

Each region has a liaising advisor. Individual schools do not have local governing bodies but advisory panels.

A Central Team operates across the trust providing support services for finance, ICT, procurement, human resources, catering, data, curriculum development, staff development, health and safety. Schools have control of 94.5% of their budget: the Central Team budget is 5.5%.

Academies
Beacon Primary Academy, Skegness, 4-11
Bishop Creighton Academy, Peterborough, 4-11
City of Peterborough Academy, 11-16
City of Peterborough Academy Special School, 4-18
Corby Primary Academy, 4-11
Danesholme Infant Academy, Corby, 3-7
Danesholme Junior Academy, Corby, 7-11
Dogsthorpe Academy, Peterborough, 7-11
Green Oaks Primary Academy, Northampton, 3-11
Hazel Leys Academy, Corby, 3-11
Ingoldmells Academy, 4-11
Kingswood Primary Academy, Corby, 3-11
Kingswood Secondary Academy, Corby, 11-18
Mansfield Primary Academy, 3-11
Mablethorpe Primary Academy, 3–11
Nethergate Academy, Nottingham 5-19
Newark Hill Academy, 4-11
Nottingham Academy, 3-18
Nottingham Girls' Academy, 11-18
Purple Oaks Academy, Northampton, 3-18
Queensmead Primary Academy, Leicester, 3-11
Rushden Primary Academy, 4-11
Skegby Junior Academy, 3-11
Skegness Academy, 11-18
Skegness Infant Academy, 3-7
Skegness Junior Academy, 7-11
Studfall Junior Academy 
Studfall Infant Academy
Stanground Academy, Peterborough, 11-18
Sunnyside Primary Academy, Northampton, 4-11
Welland Academy, Peterborough, 4-11
The Wells Academy, Nottingham, 11-16
The Brunts Academy, Nottingham, 11-18
The Bramble Academy, Nottingham, 3-11
Weston Favell Academy, Northampton, 11-18
Woodvale Primary Academy, Northampton, 3-11

References

Multi-academy trusts